Cañas River is a river of Costa Rica. It is a tributary of the Bebedero River. It goes into Nicaragua.

References

Rivers of Costa Rica
Rivers of Nicaragua
International rivers of North America